The Republic of Senegal awards the following orders, decorations and medals.

National Order of the Lion

The National Order of the Lion was founded on 22 October 1960. It has a green ribbon.

It has the following ranks:
  Grand Cross (grand-croix)
  Grand Officer (grand officier)
  Commander (commandeur)
  Officer (officier)
  Knight (chevalier)

National Order of Merit
The Order of Merit was founded on 22 October 1960. Its ribbon is green with a narrow yellow central stripe.

It has the following ranks:
  Grand Cross
  Grand Officer
  Commander	
  Officer	
   Knight

Recipients include:
Knight Grand Cross :
 Manuel Valls

Knight
 Aminata Sow Fall, writer, 2006

Officer
Mohamed Mjid, President of the Royal Moroccan Federation of Tennis, 2009
Jocelyne Béroard, 1996
Jacob Desvarieux, 1996

Order of August 20
The Order of August 20 was founded on  2 October 1960. Its ribbon is red with a central black stripe.

Order of Academic Palms
The Order of Academic Palms was founded on 23 December 1974. Its ribbon is purple with a yellow central stripe.

It has the following ranks:
    Commander
  Officer
   Knight

Order of Agricultural Merit
The Order of Agricultural Merit was founded on 7 August 1982. Its ribbon is blue with a maroon central stripe and green edges.

It has the following ranks:
    Commander
   Officer
   Knight

Military medals
   Cross of Military Valor
Instituted: 1 February 1968. Awarded: for acts of valour in peace or war. Ribbon: maroon with a yellow-edged black central stripe.

  Military Medal
Instituted: 28 April 1964. Awarded: for acts of valour or to NCOs for long and meritorious service. Ribbon: green with a yellow central stripe and narrow yellow edges.

    Wound Medal
Awarded: for sustaining wounds in combat. Ribbon: green with a narrow red central stripe.

Medals of Honour
  Medal of Honour of the Army
Instituted: 12 March 2007. Ribbon: red with blue edges.
  Medal of Honour of the Gendarmerie 
Instituted: 1978. Ribbon: blue with a green, yellow and red central stripe.
   Medal of Honour of the Police 
Instituted: 29 May 1972. Ribbon: yellow with a green central stripe and red edges.
   Medal of Honour of the Customs Service
Instituted: 13 January 1966. Ribbon: yellow with a red central stripe and green edges.
  Medal of Honour of Firefighters 
Instituted: 31 December 1980.
 Medal of Honour of Primary Teachers

Women's Medal
Recipients include:
Cheikh Tidiane Tall, artist and musician.

Other medals
  Medal of Labour  (Instituted: 25 February 1966. Awarded: for long service in a maximum of 3 different jobs. Ranks: Great Gold Medal for 30 Years; Gold Medal for 25 Years; Silver-Gilt Medal for 20 Years; Silver Medal for 15 Years. Ribbon: wide horizontal stripes of green, yellow and red.)
 Medal for Good Truck Drivers

References

External links

 Medals of Senegal